Polypogon viridis, the beardless rabbitsfoot grass, is a species of perennial grass in the family Poaceae (true grasses). They have a self-supporting growth form and simple, broad leaves. Individuals can grow to 0.43 m.

Sources

References 

viridis
Flora of Malta